The 2011 European Open Water Swimming Championships was the 13th edition of the European Open Water Swimming Championships (but the 5th stand alone after 1989, 1991, 1993, and 2008 editions) and took part from 6–11 September 2011 in Eilat, Israel.

Results

Men

Women

Mixed

Medal table

See also
 2011 European Aquatics Championships
 List of medalists at the European Open Water Swimming Championships

References

External links
 Ligue Européenne de Natation LEN Official Website

European Open Water Swimming Championships
European Open Water Championships